N. A. Naseer, born 10 June 1962 in Ernakulam district, Kerala, is an Indian wildlife photographer, nature conservation activist and author, who is a member of the Bombay Natural History Society. He is sometimes called the ambassador of Kerala's forests. He is Martial Artist (Karate, Thai -chi, chi gung )

Career

In addition to leading Malayalam periodicals, he writes on wildlife with photographs, in magazines like the Mathrubhumi Yathra travel magazine, Mathrubhumi weekly Sanctuary Asia, Hornbill, Frontline, Outlook, Traveller, and others. Besides conducting sessions about nature conservation, photography all over South India, he teaches martial arts.

Books
 Woods and Photographer, which was the first book on wildlife which was written in Malayalam, Naseer's mother tongue, and sold out three months after being published. It has photographs of fauna native to South India.
 Kadine chennu thodumbol:  
 Kadum Camerayum
 Vranam pootha chantham
 Malamuzhakki (2020)
 Kattil oppam nadannavarum pozhinju poyavarum

Awards and honours
 2013-KR Devanand Memorial Award
 2011-Excellency in Photography award by All Kerala Photography Association

See also
 Sandesh Kadur

References

External links

1962 births
Living people
Indian wildlife photographers
Artists from Kochi
20th-century Indian photographers
Indian conservationists
Indian Muslims
Photographers from Kerala